Midnight Train (Chinese: 午夜火车) is a 2013 Chinese horror film directed by Jiangnan Zhang.

Reception
Derek Elley of Film Business Asia gave the film a 5 out of 10.

References

External links

Chinese horror thriller films
2013 horror films
2013 horror thriller films
2013 films